Thierry Dassault (born 26 March 1957, in Neuilly-sur-Seine) is a French investor and billionaire entrepreneur. He is chairman of the supervisory board and deputy CEO of the Dassault Group.

He is the son of Serge Dassault, and grandson of Marcel Dassault. His brothers are Olivier Dassault and Laurent Dassault, and his sister Marie-Hélène Habert.

Dassault is a bachelor and has no children.

Wealth 
According to Forbes, Dassault is worth an estimated $9.6 billion, making him the 344th richest person in the world.

References 

1957 births
Living people
French people of Jewish descent
Dassault family